Hello Monster (lit. I Remember You) is a South Korean television series starring Seo In-guk, Jang Na-ra, Choi Won-young, and Park Bo-gum. It aired on KBS2 from June 22 to August 11, 2015 every Mondays and Tuesdays at 21:55 for 16 episodes.

Despite the show's lacklustre ratings, audiences and critics alike praised its story and the performances of the cast, particularly Park Bo-gum's performance.

Synopsis
Genius profiler Lee Hyun (Seo In-guk), returns home to Korea after something from a case he has been sent triggers a memory he thought he had lost forever. Unbeknownst to him, one of his team members, Detective Cha Ji-an (Jang Na-ra), has been investigating him for some time. She is aware that his father was murdered and his brother disappeared under mysterious circumstances involving a criminal named Lee Joon Young (Do Kyungsoo) -- whom they both want found and incarcerated. Each seeks to unravel the other, unaware that they've been drawn into a dangerous game of cat and mouse by a master player and that both truth and evil are closer and far more twisted than they think.

Cast

Main
Seo In-guk as Lee Hyun / David Lee
Hong Hyun-taek as young Lee Hyun
Lee Hyun was a "strange child" who caught the attention of his father, a police inspector, who later confined him in a small room to prevent him from breeding criminal thoughts. An intelligent child, he later studies abroad and becomes a reputed professor. Strangely, he loses his childhood memories, and a series of events lead him to return to South Korea. There he tries to solve numerous murder cases that seem to be linked to one another in order to find his long-lost little brother, whom he presumed to be the serial killer.

Jang Na-ra as Cha Ji-an
 Park Ji-so as young Cha Ji-an
Cha Ji-an's father mysteriously disappeared together with Lee Joon-young, a convicted prisoner who was said to have escaped from confinement. She becomes a police inspector and meets Lee Hyun, the boy she has been stalking since her childhood. Their similar circumstances lead them together as they work to solve criminal cases.

Choi Won-young as Lee Joon-ho / Lee Joon-young
Do Kyung-soo as teen Lee Joon-young
Born as a result of rape, Joon-young was neglected as a child. He soon bred murderous thoughts and became a murderer who eventually escaped from prison. 20 years later, he returned with the identity of Lee Joon-ho.

Park Bo-gum as Jung Sun-ho / Lee Min
Hong Eun-taek as young Lee Min
Lee Min shared a close relationship with Lee Hyun as a child and often confided his darkest secrets to him. He feels neglected later on as he was under the misconception that he had been abandoned by his brother after their father was murdered. He later appears nearly 20 years later using the name Jung Sun-ho.

Supporting 
Lee Chun-hee as Kang Eun-hyuk
The leader of the special investigator team and son of the police commissioner.
Min Sung-wook as Son Myung-woo
 Special investigator member and senior of Cha Ji-an. He is cynical and is annoyed by Lee Hyun's attitude.
Kim Jae-young as Min Seung-joo
 The youngest member of the team. He is a bright young man who is cheerful.
Son Seung-won as Choi Eun-bok
 Special investigator team member. He is a slightly quiet person. Unbeknownst to the team, he is one of the kid that Lee Joon-young saved from his hellish childhood life.
Im Ji-eun as Hyun Ji-soo
Planning director of the investigation team and Lee Hyun's adoptive mother.
Nam Kyung-eup as Kang Seok-joo
Police commissioner and father of Kang Eun-hyuk
Lee Bom as Joon-ho's mother
She was raped and gave birth to Lee Joon-ho.

Guest and cameo appearances

Shin Dong-mi as Yang Eun-jung
Cha Ji-an's aunt.  
Jun Kwang-ryul as Lee Joong-min
Lee Hyun's and Min's father.  
Tae In-ho as Yang Seung-hoon 
A chaebol, who is a serial killer and Jung Sun-ho's client
Choi Deok-moon as Na Bong-sung
Lee Hyun's indebted friend, who Hyun always ask a favor from
Lee So-yoon
Yoo Hyung-kwan as Yang Jin-seok
Park Gun-rak
Lee Won-jae 
Ha In-hwan 
Bae Ki-bum 
Han Young-kwan
Yoon Dong-young 
Dong Yoon-seok 
Song Ui-joon 
Shin Jae-ha as Park Dae-young (episode 5)
 A serial killer whose motive is to avenge his mother and little sister's death
Kim Jong-gu as Shin Jang-ho
Jung Jong-ryul
Kim Kyu-chul as Park Young-chul (episode 5)
 Park Dae-young's father, a prisoner who was accused of killing his wife and daughter
Seo Young-joo as Lee Jung-ha (episodes 6–7)
Lee Han-chul's son
Yoo Se-hyung as Lee Jin-woo
Lee Jung-ha's friend. His father was murdered by Lee Han-chul.
Ryu Sung-hyun as Lee Han-chul (episodes 6–7)
Lee Jung-ha's father, a serial killer and rapist
Lim Seong-eon as Ji Hyun-sook (episodes 9–10)
Myung-woo's blind date, who later was abducted by a serial killer and his girlfriend
Ko Kyu-pil as Park Soo-yong
Park Jae-woong as Do Jae-shik (episode 10)
A serial killer
Lee El as Kang Sung-eun (episodes 9–10)
Do Jae-shik's girlfriend and accomplice
Kim Min-kyung
Hwang Min-ho

Production
The first script reading took place in end-April 2015 at the annex of KBS in Yeouido, Seoul, South Korea.

Ratings
In this table,  represent the lowest ratings and  represent the highest ratings.

Awards and nominations

International broadcast

References

External links
  
 
 
 

Korean Broadcasting System television dramas
2015 South Korean television series debuts
Korean-language television shows
Detective television series
Television series by CJ E&M
2015 South Korean television series endings
South Korean thriller television series
South Korean crime television series